Hülsede is a municipality in the district of Schaumburg, in Lower Saxony, Germany.

Places of interest 
 Hülsede Water Castle

References

Municipalities in Lower Saxony
Schaumburg